Anwar is a 2007 Indian romantic thriller film written and directed by Manish Jha, who is famous for his work in Matrubhoomi. The film stars Siddharth Koirala, Manisha Koirala, Rajpal Yadav and Nauheed Cyrusi. The film is well known for its songs especially "Maula Mere Maula" the song has been cited as one of the best Bollywood songs ever produced in history and remains a cult classic song. Other popular is "Tose Naina".

Plot
Anwar lives a middle-class lifestyle in Lucknow, India, with his mother and sister Suraiya. Anwar is researching ancient Hindu Temples. The family rents out a room to a poor widow and her attractive daughter, Mehru, whom Anwar falls in love with.

Anwar is certain of Mehru's love for him, but Mehru has her heart set on settling in America. She is tired of the dust, the summer heat, and the struggles and tragedy of her poverty-stricken country. Anwar tells Mehru it is not possible for him to take her to the U.S. Even if he works all day, it is impossible and out of his reach. Mehru expresses her interest in Udit, an engineer that has plans to settle in America. Mehru begins a relationship with Udit, which one day is revealed to Anwar. One day Anwar visits Udit who tells him of his plan to marry Mehru before going to the USA as his visa is ready. Anwar tells him that he should think once again before doing this because of the differences in religion, as Mehru is a follower of Islam and Udit is a follower of Hinduism. If Mehru's strict and conservative family members come to know about this, they will shatter the dreams of Mehru and Udit and even their life will not be spared. Seeing that Udit has ignored his warning, Anwar confesses his feelings to Mehru when they meet on the terrace and he begs her not to leave him. He cannot imagine his life without her, but Mehru says that she never loved Anwar. Mehru runs away with Udit. Later, seeing Mehru's mother cry her heart out for her daughter, Anwar out of impulsiveness tells her and the family that she has run away with a Hindu man. Mehru's uncle along with 2 other men finds the two, shoots Udit, and brings the injured Mehru back home. Mehru commits suicide at the tragedy of Udit's death. A guilt-ridden Anwar takes shelter in an ancient Hindu temple in Dholpur carrying a bag containing drawings of mandirs and notes on Lord Krishna, Devi Meera, and Mehru. This bag ends up with the police, who come to the conclusion that Anwar is a terrorist who is planning to detonate bombs in sacred Hindu temples.

The place is surrounded by the police, politicians who are anxious to win the Hindu vote, the media, and a huge crowd drawn by the spectacle. Set against post 9/11 scenario, amidst the craze for Valentine's Day, Britney Spears, Osama bin Laden, George W. Bush, and the American way of life, Anwar must now examine his options.

In the end, Anwar gets shot by the cops and dies immediately. While dying, he has a vision of himself as Lord Krishna and his love Mehru as Meera, reuniting with each other.

Cast 

 Siddharth Koirala as Anwar
 Nauheed Cyrusi as Mehreen "Mehru"
 Manisha Koirala as Anita
 Rajpal Yadav as Gopinath
 Vijay Raaz as Master Pasha
 Yashpal Sharma as S.P. Tiwari
 Hiten Tejwani as Udit
 Sudhir Pandey as Minister
 Pankaj Jha
 Lalit Tiwari
 Rasika Dugal as Deepti
 Sanjay Mishra as Director in the Film
 Ranjith Velayudhan
 Prithvi Zutshi as CM
 Sharat Sonu as Gardener

Themes 
The film set in Lucknow is about stereotyping of Muslims in the post-9/11 era. The film was inspired by the director's experience in New York two days after the 9/11 attacks when he was detained by the police and interrogated for five hours, who presumed him to be a Muslim, since he was unshaven and had long hair.

Production 
The film was directed by Manish Jha with Faiza Ahmad Khan, Arghya Lahiri, Rishab Seth, and Meghna Sethy as assistant directors. It was shot in Kakori, Bakshi Ka Talab and Lucknow during April 2006.

Soundtrack  

The music is composed by Mithoon and Pankaj Awasthi, released on Saregama label. The movie is most notable for actor Siddharth Koirala.

Reception 
Vipin Vijayan of Rediff.com gave 2 out of 5 stars stating "Movie is strictly okay, the saving graces are the music and cinematography".
Taran Adarsh of Bollywood Hungama gave 1 out of 5 stars stating "Anwar tries to make a statement, but too many sub-plots in the screenplay spoil the show. The songs are sure to appeal to the connoisseurs of good music and called 'Maula Mere' and 'Tose Naina Lagey' standout winning tracks by composer Mithoon. Cinematography is up to the mark".

References

External links
 

2007 films
2000s Hindi-language films
2000s romantic thriller films
Indian romantic thriller films
Films set in Uttar Pradesh
Films about terrorism in India
Films scored by Mithoon
Films shot in Lucknow
Indian interfaith romance films